Madan Dilawar is an Indian politician and member of legislative assembly of Rajasthan. He represents Ramganj Mandi constituency and member of Bhartiya Janata Party.

Early life and education 
He contributed during Ram Mandir Andolan in 1990.

Political career 
Madan Dilawar is an Indian politician and member of legislative assembly of Rajasthan. He represents Ramganj Mandi constituency. Madan won the election by a margin of 12879 votes in 2018.

References 

Living people
Rajasthan MLAs 2018–2023
1959 births
Place of birth missing (living people)
Bharatiya Janata Party politicians from Rajasthan
Janata Party politicians